John Ballantyne  may refer to:

John Bellenden (fl. 1533–1587), or Ballantyne, Scottish writer
John Ballantyne (publisher) (1774–1821), Scottish publisher
John Ballantyne (footballer) (1892 – after 1918), Scottish footballer 
Johnny Ballantyne (1899 – after 1936), Scottish footballer 
John Ballantyne (minister) (1778–1830), Scottish minister of religion
John L. Ballantyne III (born 1931), American general
John William Ballantyne (1861–1923), Scottish physician
John Ballantine (banker), Scottish merchant, banker and friend of Robert Burns

See also
Jon Ballantyne (born 1963), Canadian musician
Jon Ballantyne (footballer) (born 1969), Australian rules footballer
John Ballantine House
John Ballentine (disambiguation)